The Afon Dulas, or North Dulas, is a river forming the border between Merionethshire/Gwynedd and Montgomeryshire/Powys in Wales. Another river called Afon Dulas joins the Dyfi from the south, upstream of its confluence with the North Dulas: locally this is referred to as the South Dulas.

Route of North Dulas
Afon Dulas rises from a source in the hills above Aberllefenni and passes through Corris, Esgairgeiliog and Pantperthog before joining the Afon Dyfi at Ffridd Gate near Machynlleth.

History 
The Dulas is recorded as an important land boundary in 1200, in a document written in 1428. This document describes the land owned by Einion ap Seisyllt, in the time of Llywelyn the Great, as "tota terra inter aquas de Dyfi et Delwas" (Latin, meaning: all the land between the rivers Dyfi and Dulas).

Roads and railways in the Dulas valley
 The A487 trunk road follows the valley from Ffridd Gate to Corris 
 The Roman road Sarn Helen probably followed the valley from Aberllefenni to Ffridd Gate
 The Corris Railway ran through the valley from Aberllefenni to Ffridd Gate

Tributaries
 Nant Garfan
 Nant Lliwdy south of Pantperthog
 Nant y Darren at Pantperthog
 Nant Cwm Cadian north of Pantperthog
 Afon Glesyrch at Esgairgeiliog
 Nant y Goedwig south of Maespoeth Junction
 Afon Deri (formerly known as Afon Corris) at Corris
 Afon Llefenni at Aberllefenni
 Nant Llwydiarth at Pont Cymerau, Aberllefenni
 Nant Ceiswyn at Pont Cymerau, Aberllefenni

South Dulas
It rises in Glaslyn, below the slopes of Foel Fadian, and passes the hamlet of Forge and Plas Dolguog before joining the Dyfi.

Close to its confluence with the Dyfi it is crossed by the Cambrian rail line on a bridge known as the Black Bridge. After the line had been repeatedly closed due to flooding after heavy rain, in 2021 it was announced that the bridge and its approaches were to be raised by a metre to try and alleviate the problem. Work began on 15 May and was due to be completed by 28 June.

Tributaries
 Afon Crewi at Felingerrig

References 

Dulas
Dulas
Dulas